The Toaping Castle was a house in present-day Greenbelt, Maryland, built  by Charles, Isaac and Nathan Walker, three brothers who fled to America from Scotland. The Walker brothers constructed the house on a  land grant in an area that eventually became Greenbelt.  Samuel Hamilton Walker was born at Toaping Castle in 1817 and later served as a Texas Ranger and U.S. Army officer who died in the Mexican–American War.

On the historical marker, located in front of a TGI Friday's restaurant at the corner of Greenbelt Road and Walker Drive, states that only the family cemetery remains of Toaping Castle.  The cemetery is located at the end of Walker Drive in the woods behind a large parking structure, and contains the graves of Isaac and Nathan Walker.

Notes

Buildings and structures in Prince George's County, Maryland
Greenbelt, Maryland